The 2007 World Nine-ball Championship was the 18th annual international nine-ball pool tournament for men sanctioned by the World Pool-Billiard Association (WPA). It was held at the Araneta Coliseum in Quezon City, Metro Manila, Philippines from 3–11 November 2007. It was the second consecutive time the tournament has been held in the Philippines.

The tournament is sponsored by Matchroom Sport, which has sponsored the event since 1999. 128 participants from 46 WPA member countries competed for US$400,000 in total prize money, including defending champion Ronato Alcano of the Philippines. The overall winner received a purse of $100,000, the highest-ever payout for the tournament.

Format
The Format of qualifying used on 2006 was used for 2007. Several last-minute qualifying tournaments were held in the Metro Manila area a few weeks before the tournament starts.

All matches are in winner's : the winner of the previous rack will break on the next rack, it was reverted from alternate break used in 2006.

There are 32 seeded players prior to the group stages; they are distributed 2 per group. The defending champion, Ronnie Alcano, is seeded #1.

Also, a double-elimination tournament will be used for the group stages; instead of 32 groups of 4, there will be 16 groups of eight, with the top four advancing. Each player will be seeded 1–8 in their groups, with a routine double-elimination tournament following the first round; however the player that wins twice will advance to the quarterfinals and will not take part in other group matches, in contrast if a player loses two games, he is eliminated. The top four players in each group therefore would have won twice. After the group stages, the routine 64-man single elimination tournament follows.

The last 64 play races to 10 racks. This is followed by the round of 16 (quarterfinals and semifinals) where the races are to 11 racks. The race in the finals jumps to 17 racks.

Notable occurrences
On day 1, a group match (race to 9) between Charles Williams and Ricky Yang took over 2 and half hours to complete, with both players accused of playing too slowly. Calls were made for moves to outlaw overly-slow play in future years.
On day 3, Jeremy Jones of the U.S. and Finland's Mika Immonen almost came to blows after Immonen eliminated Jones from contention, 9–6 at the group stages.
There was high drama on day 4, Tuesday afternoon at the Big Dome when fire broke out in the lighting rig over Table 5 on the upper tier. Each of the outside tables has a light box with fluorescent tubes that light the table and a short circuit sent sparks flying and before long the box was ablaze. Matchroom Sport's John McDonald alerted venue staff and only his quick thinking saved the table as he and cameraman Lawrence 'Lol' Lustig covered it to stop debris and foam raining down onto the felt. Before long temporary lights were installed and play was able to commence at the designated time.
On the quarterfinals, Francisco Bustamante, leading Daryl Peach 10–9 in a race to 11 match, failed to play position on the 3-ball and snookered himself behind the 9-ball. A kick shot struck both the 3 and 9 balls, fluking the 9 into a corner pocket. With the player and crowd celebrating the win, a lengthy inquiry began, in which the referee and tournament officials studied frame-by-frame replays of the shot, before concluding that the 9 had been struck first, and the shot was therefore a foul. After the lengthy break in play, in which Bustamante insisted the shot had been legal, Peach held his nerve amongst a partisan Filipino crowd to run the last two racks of the match to win 11–10, en route to his World Championship victory the following day.

Players

By nation
The WPA considered the home nations of England and Scotland as separate entities for the tournament and the codes of "ENG" and "SCO" was subsequently shown in the TV broadcast instead of "GBR."

15 players: Philippines
14 players: Chinese Taipei (Taiwan)
11 players: United States
7 players: Germany
6 players: Canada and England
5 players: Japan
4 players: Australia
3 players: China, Holland (Netherlands), Indonesia, Italy, Poland, Scotland, Serbia and Singapore.
2 players: Chile, Hong Kong, Korea, Malaysia, Spain and Vietnam.
1 player: Austria, Belgium, Brunei, Croatia, Czech Republic, Denmark, Eritrea, Finland, Hungary, India, Iran, Ireland, Malta, New Zealand, Nicaragua, Qatar, Russia, Slovenia, South Africa, Sweden, Switzerland, Thailand, Turkey and UAE

Seeded

Unseeded players who advanced to the round of 64
Player boldfaced made it to the final.

Group 1:
 Charles Williams
 Alex Lely
 Harald Stolka
Group 2:
 Leonardo Andam
 James Delahunty
 Raj Hundal
Group 3:
 Vilmos Földes
 Radosław Babica
Group 4:
 Lu Hui-chan
 Joven Bustamante
 Antonio Gabica
Group 5:
 Ko Pin-yi
 Jeff de Luna
 Edwin Montal
 Sandor Tot
Group 6:
 Kenichi Uchigaki
 Alain Martel
Group 7:
 Ramil Gallego
 Nick van den Berg
 Chan Kwen-Kwang
Group 8:
 Muhammad Zulfikri
 Philipp Stojanovic
Group 9:
 Oliver Ortmann
 Phan Tuan Ngoc
Group 10:
 Louis Condo
 Kuo Po-cheng
Group 11:
 Marco Tschudi
 Bahram Lofty
 Rye Seung-Woo
Group 12:
 Karl Boyes
 Goran Mladenovic
Group 13:
 Satoshi Kawabata
 Marcus Chamat
Group 14:
 Marlon Manalo
 Dejan Dabovic
Group 15:
 Lee Kung-fang
 Naoyuki Oi
 Wu Yun-lin
Group 16:
 Roberto Gomez
 Matjaz Erculj

Group stage

Group 1

Group 2

Group 3

Group 4

Group 5

Group 6

Group 7

Group 8

Group 9

Group 10

Group 11

Group 12

Knockout stages

Section 1

Section 2

Section 3

Section 4

Semifinals and final

Country representation

Final

References

External links
Official website

2007 in cue sports
2007 in Philippine sport
2007 WPA Men's World Nine-ball Championship
2007 WPA Men's World Nine-ball Championship